The Hero XPulse 200 is an Indian dual sport motorcycle manufactured by Hero MotoCorp, premiering in February 2019 and launched on 1 May 2019.

Model history 
The history of the XPulse starts with the introduction of the Hero Impulse. The Impulse was India's first adventure bike in 150cc segment. Since its inception, the bike receives a lot of appreciation from the buyers because of its amazing body but due to the low power of the bike and lack of proper marketing, the Impulse failed.  After the commercial failure of the Impulse, Hero MotoCorp decided to fill the void in the segment with the addition of a higher displacement ADV motorcycle named the XPulse 200. Unlike the Impulse, the new XPulse is an adventure tourer motorcycle.

Hero first unveiled the motorcycle at the 2017 EICMA Show in Italy. The XPulse 200 carries forward the legacy of the Impulse, but it is more accessible and more purposeful. The motorcycle has been updated to comply with the newest, more stringent emission norms. Upon its introduction, the XPulse 200 was praised for its good suspension and off-road ability, while some criticism was directed to the relatively low power output of the engine. The motorcycle also has longer intervals between servicing and oil changes.

Powering the XPulse 200 BS6 is a 199.6cc, single-cylinder engine that now features an oil-cooled setup instead of the air-cooled layout on the BS4 model. The updated motor produces 17.8bhp of power at 8,500rpm and 16.45Nm of torque at 6,500rpm. The engine is mated to a five-speed gearbox. Hero offers the XPulse 200 BS6 in a single variant with fuel-injection. The carburettor version has been discontinued.

Design

Engine 
The Xpulse 200's engine was designed and produced by Hero from the ground-up and shares little to no parts with other contemporaries in the company's line-up. The motor generates a power output of 17.8 bhp at 8,500 rpm (13.3 KW) and a maximum torque of 16.45 Nm at 6,500 rpm. The engine also includes an oil cooler, a first among motorcycles manufactured by Hero, India. Due to the emission norms in India BS-IV regulation has been applied, Now the New XPulse 200 comes with Fuel Injection Technology in India. The engine is mated to a 5-speed constant mesh transmission.

Frame and chassis 
The XPulse 200 has a tubular diamond frame. Suspension is telescopic in the front while the rear is provided with monoshock suspension. Front forks are 37 mm with 190 mm of travel and the rear suspension offers 180 mm of travel. The motorcycle has a ground clearance of 220 mm. The motorcycle has a 276 mm disc at the front and a 220 mm single piston caliper disc at rear.

References

External links
 
 https://indianautosblog.com/2020-hero-xpulse-200-bsvi-road-test-review-p321388

Motorcycles of India